The Homoeotrichaceae are a family of cyanobacteria.

References

Oscillatoriales
Cyanobacteria families